An everywoman is a stock character in drama; an ordinary individual, with whom the audience is able to easily identify.

Everywoman may also refer to:

 Everywoman (film), a 1919 lost film
 everywoman (organisation), a women's professional organization
 Everywoman (radio programme), a radio programme

See also
Everyman (disambiguation)